Wolfgang Dandorfer  (born 5 June 1949  in Vilseck) is a German politician, representative of the Christian Social Union in Bavaria.

He has been a mayor of Amberg on many occasions since 1990. He left office in April 2014. He was a member of the Landtag of Bavaria between 1982 and 1990.

See also
List of Bavarian Christian Social Union politicians

References

Christian Social Union in Bavaria politicians
1949 births
Living people
People from Amberg-Sulzbach
Mayors of places in Germany